James or Jim Page may refer to:
James Page (Australian educationist) (born 1953)
James Page (boxer) (born 1971), American boxer
James H. Page, Chancellor of the University of Maine system
James O. Page (1936–2004), American authority on emergency medical services
James Page (rower) (1900–1977), British rower
James Page (minister) (1808–1883), African-American minister
James Page, Minneapolis attorney and founder of the James Page Brewing Company 
Jimmy Page (born 1944), English guitarist for Led Zeppelin
Jimmy Page (footballer) (born 1964), Scottish footballer 
Jim Page (politician) (1861–1921), Australian politician
Jim Page (singer) (born 1949), American singer-songwriter and social activist
Jim Page (skier) (born 1941), American Olympic skier
James Page (photographer), partner of Walter B. Woodbury in Woodbury & Page